Deemed status is a hospital accreditation for hospitals in the United States.

Getting deemed status

Meeting Conditions for Coverage and Conditions of Participation
For any organization to receive funding from Centers for Medicare and Medicaid Services (CMS), that organization must meet either the "Conditions for Coverage" or the "Conditions of Participation". These are a set of minimal standards which must be met before CMS will ever issue any reimbursement for Medicare and Medicaid Services. Two kinds of organizations can review a health care provider to check for compliance with these conditions - either a state level agency acting on behalf of CMS, or a national accreditation agency like the Joint Commission.

Examples of some of the areas of focus for these minimal guidelines are the End Stage Renal Disease Program, ambulatory surgical centers, and organ procurement organizations.

The standards for care for nursing homes were distributed as a result of the Nursing Home Reform Act.

Outpatient clinics cannot receive deemed status. A consequence of this is that the CMS payment systems can be more complicated at small clinics than at large hospitals for the same procedures.

Conditions for Coverage and Conditions of Participation apply to these kinds of organizations:

Ambulatory Surgical Centers (ASCs)
Community Mental Health Centers (CMHCs)
Comprehensive Outpatient Rehabilitation Facilities (CORFs)
Critical Access Hospitals (CAHs)
End-Stage Renal Disease Facilities
Federally Qualified Health Centers
Home Health Agencies
Hospices
Hospitals
Hospital Swing Beds
Intermediate Care Facilities for Individuals with Intellectual Disabilities (ICF/IID)
Organ Procurement Organizations (OPOs)
Portable X-Ray Suppliers
Programs for All-Inclusive Care for the Elderly Organizations (PACE)
Clinics, Rehabilitation Agencies, and Public Health Agencies as Providers of Outpatient Physical Therapy and Speech-Language Pathology Services
Psychiatric Hospitals
Religious Nonmedical Health Care Institutions
Rural Health Clinics
Long Term Care Facilities
Transplant Centers

When any of these organizations are reviewed, the survey checks quality assurance and not "continuous quality improvement". In other words, the process checks for minimal expectations, and not to see whether the facility is actually improving.

History
In 1994 about 5000 hospitals were eligible to receive CMS funding as a result of being reviewed by the Joint Commission.

The Medicare Improvements for Patients and Providers Act of 2008 removed the deemed status of the Joint Commission and directed it to re-apply to CMS to seek continued authority to review hospitals for CfC and CoP.

References

Accreditation
 
Medicare and Medicaid (United States)
Quality assurance
Health care quality